Artem Bely (born 28 April 1997) is a Belarusian professional footballer who plays for Lida.

References

External links
 
 

1997 births
Living people
Belarusian footballers
Association football goalkeepers
Belarusian expatriate footballers
Expatriate footballers in Kazakhstan
FC Dinamo Minsk players
FC Isloch Minsk Raion players
FC Arsenal Dzerzhinsk players
FC Naftan Novopolotsk players
FC Lida players